Nikola Chivarov Tzanev (born 23 December 1996) is a New Zealand professional footballer who plays as a goalkeeper for  club AFC Wimbledon . He is a product of the Brentford Academy and is a New Zealand international.

Club career

Brentford 
A goalkeeper, Tzanev moved from his native New Zealand to England in 2006 and trained with a Chelsea development programme before joining the academy at Crystal Palace. He moved to join the academy at Brentford and progressed through the ranks to sign a Youth Development contract in 2013, which enabled him to continue his education through to his A-levels. He made 39 appearances for the youth team during the final three seasons of his youth career and won the club's Youth Team Player of the Year award for his performances during the 2014–15 season.

Tzanev signed a one-year Development Squad contract at the end of the 2014–15 season, but made just eight appearances and played a month away on loan at Isthmian League Premier Division strugglers Lewes before his release at the end of the 2015–16 season.

AFC Wimbledon

2016–2018 
During the course of the 2016–17 season, Tzanev trialled with EFL clubs Wycombe Wanderers and Hartlepool United. He joined the AFC Wimbledon Development Squad on trial in March 2017 and impressed enough to be awarded a contract until the end of the season on 28 April 2017. He was called into the first team squad for the club's final match of the season versus Oldham Athletic and remained an unused substitute during the 0–0 draw. Tzanev signed a new contract on 8 May 2017 and was an unused substitute on five occasions during the 2017–18 season.

2018–19 
Tzanev signed a new contract in July 2018, but received just one call into the first team squad during the first half of the 2018–19 season. On 18 January 2019, Tzanev joined Isthmian League Premier Division club Potters Bar Town on a one-month loan, which was subsequently extended until the end of the season. He made 15 appearances during his spell.

2019–20 
Having signed a contract extension in February 2019, injury to first-choice goalkeeper Nathan Trott allowed Tzanev to make his debut for the club on the opening day of the 2019–20 season, in a 2–1 defeat to Rotherham United. Tzanev made three further appearances before spending the remainder of the season away on loan at National League club Sutton United, whom he joined on 15 November 2019. He made 19 appearances before the season was ended early.

2020–2022 
Tzanev served as backup to goalkeepers Connal Trueman and then Sam Walker for much of the 2020–21 season and played predominantly in cup matches. A injury suffered by Walker in March 2021 allowed Tzanev to break into the starting lineup for the first time in his career with the club and he finished the season with 19 appearances. Ahead of the beginning of the 2021–22 season, Tzanev was awarded squad number 1 and after starting each of the Dons' first eight matches of the campaign, he signed a new three-year contract. He made a career-high 53 appearances during a 2021–22 season which culminated in relegation to League Two.

International career 
Tzanev won his maiden call up to the New Zealand U20 squad for two friendlies versus Uzbekistan in April 2015 and made his debut in the second match, playing the full 90 minutes. He was called into the New Zealand squad for the 2015 U20 World Cup, held on home turf and he made two appearances as the All Whites reached the last-16. He was subsequently called into the U23 squad for the 2015 Pacific Games, but failed to make an appearance.

Tzanev received his maiden senior international call-up for a friendly match versus Canada on 25 March 2018 and was an unused substitute during the 1–0 defeat. He was named in a youthful squad for the 2018 Intercontinental Cup and made his full international debut with a start in a 1–0 victory over Chinese Taipei on 5 June 2018. More than three years after his previous call-up, Tzanev was named in the squad for a pair of friendlies in Bahrain in October 2021, but he was not selected in either matchday squad.

Personal life 
Tzanev was born in Wellington and moved to Auckland at age three, before moving to London in 2006 at age 9. He attended Hinchley Wood School. He holds dual nationality with Bulgaria.

Career statistics

Club

International

Honours 
Individual
 Brentford Youth Team Player of the Year: 2014–15

References

External links

Nik Tzanev at afcwimbledon.co.uk

Living people
New Zealand association footballers
English Football League players
Association football goalkeepers
Isthmian League players
Lewes F.C. players
1996 births
New Zealand people of Bulgarian descent
New Zealand expatriate association footballers
Expatriate footballers in England
New Zealand under-20 international footballers
New Zealand expatriate sportspeople in England
Association footballers from Wellington City
AFC Wimbledon players
New Zealand international footballers
Potters Bar Town F.C. players
Sutton United F.C. players
National League (English football) players